Santol may refer to:
 Santol (fruit), a tropical fruit
 Santol, La Union, a municipality in the Philippines
 Santol, a barangay of Quezon City in the Philippines
 an alternative name for Orobol, an isoflavone
 Santol, a former canine  ambassador at the Fairmont Le Château Frontenac in Québec City